The 1969 Cotton Bowl Classic featured the Texas Longhorns versus the Tennessee Volunteers.

Background
In the 1951 Cotton Bowl Classic, the Volunteers upset the Longhorns 20–14. In the 1953 Cotton Bowl Classic, Texas beat Tennessee 16–0. This was the third Cotton Bowl between the two teams. Texas was Southwest Conference co-champions due to losing to Texas Tech early in the season, thus they shared it with Arkansas. Tennessee finished 2nd in the Southeastern Conference to Georgia due to losing to Auburn late in the season.

Game summary
It may have been a matchup of top 10 teams, but Texas beat them like any ordinary team as they scored 28 points in the first half while allowing none. Steve Worster, Ted Koy, and Chris Gilbert each had touchdown runs, and Cotton Speyrer caught two touchdown passes from James Street, the last one making it 36–6. In the second half, Tennessee scored on a Gary Kreis catch from Bobby Scott to make it 28–6 and Mike Price caught a touchdown pass to narrow it to 36–13, but by that point, there was only two minutes left in the game.

Aftermath
Texas went unbeaten the following season and returned to the Cotton Bowl Classic to face off against Notre Dame, winning that game, and with it, the National Championship.

Outstanding Players of the Game
Texas
Tom Campbell, who helped Texas' defense limit Tennessee to just 275 yards offense.
Cotton Speyrer, who caught two touchdown passes on five catches for 161 yards.
James Street, who went 7–13 for 200 yards and two touchdowns.

Statistics

References

Cotton Bowl Classic
Cotton Bowl Classic
Tennessee Volunteers football bowl games
Texas Longhorns football bowl games
Cotton Bowl
January 1969 sports events in the United States